Kay Cockerill (born October 16, 1964 in San Jose, California) is an American golfer.

Amateur and college career
She won the U.S. Women's Amateurs in 1986 and 1987. As a non-scholarship player at UCLA she had six individual wins from 1983 to 1986, was an All-American in 1985 and 1986, an Academic All-American in 1985/1986, placed fourth in the 1986 NCAA Championship, and was named to the NGCA Hall of Fame in 1986.  She was inducted into the UCLA Athletics Hall of Fame in 1999. She graduated from UCLA in 1987 with a degree in Economics.

Professional golf career
She turned professional and joined the LPGA Tour in October 1987. She also played on the Futures Tour, winning once in 1988. She retired in 1997.

Broadcasting career
Since retiring from competition, Cockerill has worked as a reporter for Golf Channel covering the LPGA and Nationwide Tours.

Personal life
Cockerill lives in San Francisco and is married to Danny Dann, a vice president of special events with the San Francisco Giants.

Professional wins (1)

Futures Tour wins (1)

U.S. national team appearances
Amateur
Espirito Santo Trophy: 1986

References

External links

Profile on Golf Channel's official site

American female golfers
LPGA Tour golfers
Winners of ladies' major amateur golf championships
Golf writers and broadcasters
Sportspeople from San Jose, California
Golfers from San Francisco
1964 births
Living people
21st-century American women